Veliki Trnovac is a village in the municipality of Bujanovac, Serbia. According to the 2002 census, the village had a population of 6,762. Of these, 6,730 (99,52%) were ethnic Albanians, 1 (0,01%) Bulgarian, 1 (0,01%) Bosniak, and 12 (0,17%) others.

History

Insurgency aftermath 
There is an agreement between the Serbian authorities and local Albanians that Veliki Trnovac will not be attended by police in exchange for peace on the part of local population, an agreement that formed part of the Konculj Agreement in 2001 ending the Insurgency in the Preševo Valley.

After the conflict, at the entrance to Veliki Trnovac, local Albanians erected a monument to Ridvan Qazimi, a former commander of UCPMB who is highly respected by Albanians in southern Serbia, and a four-day manifestation, "Commander Lleshi"s Days", is held in his honor every year. He also got his own museum, which opened on 26 November 2012 in Veliki Trnovac. It was built by local Albanians with the help of the Albanian diaspora. It exhibits Captain Leshi's personal belongings - photographs, uniform, weapons as well as the jeep in which he was killed.

2022 general election 
During the 2022 general election, elections were repeated five times in Veliki Trnovac. Because of it, official results were announced three months after the official election date.

Notable people
 Nexhat Daci, Kosovar politician
 Shaip Kamberi, Serbian ethnic Albanian politician
 Berat Djimsiti, Albanian footballer

References

Populated places in Pčinja District
Albanian communities in Serbia